"Frankenstein" is an instrumental by the Edgar Winter Group from their 1972 album They Only Come Out at Night.

The song topped the US Billboard Hot 100 chart for one week in May 1973, being replaced by Paul McCartney's "My Love". It sold over one million copies. In Canada it fared equally well, reaching number 1 on the RPM 100 Top Singles Chart the following month. That same month the song peaked at number 18 in the UK Singles Chart. The following month, the song peaked at number 10 in Mexico. The song also peaked at number 39 in West Germany, remaining on the chart for one week.  The single was certified gold June 19, 1973, by the RIAA.

Background
The song's title, coined by the band's drummer Chuck Ruff, derives from the fact that the original recording of the song was much longer than the final version, as the band would often deviate from the arrangement into less structured jams. The track required numerous edits to shorten it. The end result was spliced together from many sections of recording. Winter frequently refers to the appropriateness of the name also in relation to its "monster-like, alumbering beat". (One riff was first used by Winter in the song "Hung Up", on his jazz-oriented first album Entrance. He later tried a variation on it, "Martians" on the 1981 Standing on Rock album.)

Winter played many of the instruments on the track, including keyboards, alto saxophone and timbales. As the release's only instrumental cut, the song was not initially intended to be on the album, and was only included on a whim as a last-minute addition. It was originally released as the B-side to "Hangin' Around", but the two were soon reversed by the label when disc jockeys nationwide in the United States, as well as in Canada, were inundated with phone calls and realized this was the hit. The song features a "double" drum solo, with Ruff on drums and Winter on percussion. In fact, the working title of the song was "The Double Drum Song". The group performed the song, with Rick Derringer on guitar, on The Old Grey Whistle Test in 1973.

The song was actually performed three years previously when Edgar was playing with his older brother Johnny Winter at the Royal Albert Hall in 1970. This rare recording was released in 2004 as one of several live bonus tracks included in the two-disc Legacy Edition CD of Johnny Winter's Second Winter.

Rolling Stone listed it number 7 on their top 25 best rock instrumentals. Sections of the track were edited and sequenced into idents and jingles for Alan Freeman's Top 40 and Saturday Rock Show on UK's BBC Radio 1 and BBC Radio 2 for many years, often followed with Freeman's trademark opening line "Greetings Pop Pickers..."

In live performances of the song, Edgar Winter further pioneered the advancement of the synthesizer as a lead instrument by becoming the first person ever to strap a keyboard instrument around his neck, giving him the on-stage mobility and audience interaction of guitar players.

The song is described as a hard rock and progressive rock instrumental, and an example of art rock by non-art rock bands.

In 1983, Winter released a beat-heavy, more-synthesizer-heavy reworking of the song; its contemporaneous video, an homage with Winter appearing as Dr. Frankenstein, was added to MTV's playlist in November of that year.

Personnel
Edgar Winter – ARP 2600 synthesizer, electric piano, alto saxophone, timbales
Ronnie Montrose – guitar
Dan Hartman – bass
Chuck Ruff – drums
Rick Derringer – producer

Cover versions
"Frankenstein" has been covered by the rock group Phish 91 times as of January 2020, with the first time in 1989; keyboardist Page McConnell often utilizes a keytar for the synthesizer solo. In 1991 it was covered by the thrash metal band Overkill on their album Horrorscope. They Might Be Giants have covered this song in their live repertoire for many years, mainly between 1992 and 1995. The Southern California band Bazooka covered "Frankenstein" on their 1993 debut album Perfectly Square. In 1996, British psychedelic glam group Doctor and the Medics wrote lyrics for the track, including it on their album Instant Heaven.

Derek Sherinian's 2001 solo album Inertia includes his cover of the song. It was covered in 2003 by surfer-rock guitarist Gary Hoey. Those Darn Accordions recorded an accordion-based version of the song for their 2004 album Lawnball. Bass guitarist Marcus Miller included it in his 2005 album Silver Rain. Tomoyasu Hotei covered it on his 2009 covers album Modern Times Rock'N'Roll. Claude François, the French singer and writer of "My Way", used the song, played with a brass section, as an introductory theme to his live concerts. Primus covered the song at midnight during their 2012/2013 New Year's Eve show. Warren Hill features a version for saxophone on his 2015 release Under the Influence.

Rock violinist Deni Bonet covered the song on her 2017 album Bright Shiny Objects. The track features Liberty DeVitto, longtime drummer for Billy Joel, and Lenny Kravitz' bass player Jack Daley among others. This version was also orchestrated by Danny Elfman's orchestrator Steve Bartek. Bonet premiered it in October 2017 with the award-winning Baylor University Symphony to a standing ovation.

A few bars of an edited version of the song feature at the very beginning of the 1993 film, Wayne's World 2, as the Paramount Pictures 'Stars' logo appears. The 1995 pinball table Mary Shelley's Frankenstein includes a version. A cover version performed by WaveGroup Sound was featured in the video game Guitar Hero as one of five tracks in its sixth and highest difficulty tier, referred to in-game as "Face Melters".

Chart performance

Year-end charts

References

External links
A second-by-second analysis by Chuck Klosterman

1972 songs
1973 singles
1970s instrumentals
The Edgar Winter Group songs
Billboard Hot 100 number-one singles
Cashbox number-one singles
Rock instrumentals
Music based on novels
Songs about Frankenstein's monster
Epic Records singles
Music based on science fiction works
Art rock songs